The 1971–72 Kentucky Wildcats men's basketball team  represented the  University of Kentucky in the 1971–72 college basketball season. The team's head coach was  Adolph Rupp who was in his last year in coaching because of age of retirement for Kentucky coaches. They played their home games at Memorial Coliseum and were members of the Southeastern Conference.

References 
 

Kentucky
Kentucky Wildcats men's basketball seasons
Kentucky
Kentucky Wildcats
Kentucky Wildcats